A Retrospective: 1995–2000 is a compilation album of past works by Son Volt.

Track listing

Son Volt albums
2005 compilation albums
Warner Records compilation albums
Rhino Records compilation albums